Gerlach is a male forename of Germanic origin, variations of which exist in many Germanic and Romance languages. Like many other early Germanic names, it is dithematic, consisting of two meaningful constituents put together. In this case, those constituents are ger (meaning 'spear') and /la:k / (meaning 'motion'). The meaning of the name is thus 'spear thrower'.
It became a surname, and a source from which other surnames  have been derived, as well.

Personal name
 Saint Gerlach (died c. 1170), Dutch saint
 Gerlach I of Isenburg-Arnfels, Count of Isenburg-Arnfels from 1286 (1287) until 1303
 Gerlach I of Isenburg-Wied, Count of Isenburg-Wied from 1409 until 1413
 Gerlach I of Nassau-Wiesbaden (before 1288-1361), Count of Nassau
 Gerlach II of Isenburg-Arnfels, Count of Isenburg-Arnfels from 1333 until 1379
 Gerlach II of Isenburg-Covern, Count of Isenburg-Covern from 1158 until 1217
 Gerlach III of Isenburg-Covern, Count of Isenburg-Covern from 1217 until 1235
 Gerlach IV of Isenburg-Limburg (died 1289), Lord of Limburg an der Lahn
 Gerlach V of Isenburg-Limburg (died 1355), Count of Isenburg-Limburg; grandson of Gerlach IV
 Gerlach VI of Isenburg-Limburg (died 1365), Count of Isenburg-Limburg and Lord of Limburg an der Lahn; son of Gerlach V
 Gerlach Flicke (fl. 1545-1558), German portrait painter of the English Tudor court
 Gerlach Cornelis Joannes van Reenen (1818–1893), Dutch politician

Surname
 Annette Gerlach (born 1964), German TV host
 Carl Gotthelf Gerlach (1704–1761), German organist and music director
 Carl Ludvig Gerlach (1832–1893), Danish composer and opera singer
 Carl R. Gerlach, mayor of Overland Park, Kansas
 Charles L. Gerlach (1895-1947), U.S. Representative from Pennsylvania
 Chris Gerlach (born 1964), American politician
 Christian Gerlach, professor of modern history at the University of Bern
 Daniel Gerlach (born 1977), German journalist
 Elsie Gerlach, 20th century dental educator
 Ernst Ludwig von Gerlach (1795-1877), Prussian judge and politician
 Hellmut von Gerlach (1866-1935), German journalist and politician
 Jim Gerlach (born 1955), U.S. Congressman from Pennsylvania
 Joseph von Gerlach (1820-1896), German anatomist and professor
 Kurt Albert Gerlach (1886-1922), German sociologist
 Ludwig Friedrich Leopold von Gerlach (1790-1861), Prussian general
 Manfred Gerlach (1928-2011), head of state of East Germany (1989-1990)
 Otto von Gerlach (1801-1849), German theologian and pastor
 Talitha Gerlach (1896–1995), American YMCA worker who spent most of her life as a social worker in Shanghai, China
 Walther Gerlach (1889-1979), German physicist
 Wim Gerlach (1935-2007), Dutch Olympic boxer
 Irene Gerlach, fictional character in Erich Kästner's Lottie and Lisa

See also
 Gerlach Barklow Co., American manufacturer of art calendars
 Rudolf Gerlach-Rusnak (1895-1960), Ukrainian-born German tenor
 Adrien de Gerlache
 Gerlachov (disambiguation)